Osakia is a monotypic snout moth genus described Émile Louis Ragonot in 1901. Its only species, described in the same publication, Osakia lineolella, is known from Japan.

References

Moths described in 1901
Anerastiini
Moths of Japan
Monotypic moth genera
Pyralidae genera
Taxa named by Émile Louis Ragonot